Commercial Bank of Africa (CBA) was a financial services provider headquartered in Nairobi, Kenya, the largest economy in the East African Community. CBA was licensed by the Central Bank of Kenya, the central bank and national banking regulator.

, the bank was one of the largest commercial banks in Kenya with assets of approximately US$2.166 billion (KES:215.6 billion), with shareholders' equity of approximately US$217.83 million (KES:21.68 billion). It was the largest privately owned commercial bank in Kenya.

History
The bank was founded in 1962 in Dar es Salaam, Tanzania. Soon, branches were opened in Nairobi & Mombasa, Kenya and in Kampala, Uganda. When Tanzania nationalised private banks in 1967, the bank moved its headquarters to Nairobi. Following political changes in Uganda in 1971, the bank sold its assets in that country.

At the beginning, CBA was owned by a consortium of financial institutions known as Société Financière pour les Pays d'Outre-Mer (SFOM), based in Switzerland. Original members of the consortium included Banque Nationale de Paris, Bank Bruxelles Lambert, Commerzbank, and Bank of America. In 1980, Bank of America acquired 84% shareholding, effectively buying out all the other SFOM partners. Sixteen per cent shareholding in CBA remained in the hands of Kenyan investors. During the 1980s Bank of America divested from the bank, putting 100% shareholding in CBA in the hands of Kenyan nationals.

In December 2018, Commercial Bank of Africa Group (CBA Group) announced that it would be merging with NIC Group creating the Kenya's third-biggest bank. The Transaction was approved by the Kenyan regulators and shareholders in April 2019. On 27 September 2019, the Central Bank of Kenya approved the merger, effective 1 October 2019. Through the merger, the combined group, NCBA Group, was to consolidate their banking business. This led to the transfer of business to one entity renamed NCBA Bank Kenya Limited.

Ownership
Commercial Bank of Africa's ownership is under a shareholding structure. The Kenyatta family controls 24.91 percent of CBA through an investment vehicle called Enke Investments Limited. The table below illustrates the shareholding in the company stock, as of December 2017.

Commercial Bank of Africa Group 
Commercial Bank of Africa (Kenya) is a member of the CBA Group of companies. These include:
 Commercial Bank of Africa (Kenya) – Nairobi, Kenya  – 100% shareholding
 Commercial Bank of Africa (Tanzania) – Dar es Salaam, Tanzania  – 100% shareholding
 Commercial Bank of Africa (Uganda) – Kampala, Uganda  – 100% shareholding
 Commercial Bank of Africa (Rwanda) – Kigali, Rwanda – 100% shareholding
 AIG Kenya Insurance Company Limited – Nairobi, Kenya  – 33.33% shareholding. Balance of 66.67% shareholding in AIG Kenya held by the American International Group.

Governance
The chairman of the board of directors is Desterio Oyatsi, one of the non-executive directors. Isaac Awoundo serves as the managing director.

Other executives include:

 Mr. Muhoho Kenyatta – deputy chairman
 Mr. Isaac Awoundo – group managing director
 Mr. Martin Mugambi – group executive director
 Mr. Jeremy Ngunze –  chief executive – Kenya
 Mr. Stuart J Armitage – director
 Hon. Abdirahin Haithar Abdi – director
 Mr. Nicholas A. Nesbitt – director
 Mr. Nelson J.M Mainnah  – director
 Mr. Mukesh K. R. Shah – director

See also
 Commercial Bank of Africa (Tanzania)
 CBA Group
 List of banks in Kenya
 Central Bank of Kenya
 Economy of Kenya

References

External links
 Website of Commercial Bank of Africa (Kenya)
 Website of Commercial Bank of Africa (Tanzania)
 Website of Central Bank of Kenya

Defunct banks of Kenya
Banks established in 1962
Companies based in Nairobi
Kenyan companies established in 1962